Clowney is a Scottish and English surname.  Notable people with the surname include:

David Clowney (born 1985), American football wide receiver
David Cortez Clowney (b. 1938), birth name of American pianist Dave "Baby" Cortez
Edmund Clowney (1917–2005), American theologian, educator, and pastor
Jadeveon Clowney (born 1993), American football linebacker
William K. Clowney (1797–1851), American politician, U.S. Representative from South Carolina

English-language surnames